Moustadroine Abdou (born 14 June 1969) is Comorian politician from Anjouan. From 26 May 2016 to 26 May 2019, he served as the Vice-President of the Comoros responsible for Agriculture, Fishing, Environment, Spatial Planning and Urbanism. He has been the speaker of the Assembly of the Union since 3 April 2020.

References

Comorian politicians
Living people
1969 births
Vice-presidents of the Comoros
Speakers of the Assembly of the Union of the Comoros
People from Anjouan